Yupanqui is a surname. Notable people with the surname include:

Amaru Yupanqui, elder brother of Túpac Inca Yupanqui
Atahualpa Yupanqui (1908–1992), Argentine singer, songwriter, guitarist, and writer
Cápac Yupanqui, the fifth Sapa Inca of the Kingdom of Cuzco (beginning around CE 1320) and the last of the Hurin dynasty
Francisco Tito Yupanqui (1550–1616), Roman Catholic sculptor, created a famous statue of the Blessed Virgin Mary in Bolivia
Gastón Mansilla Yupanqui, (born 1990), student who killed Víctor Ríos Acevedo in 2012 in Lima, Peru
Lloque Yupanqui, the third Sapa Inca of the Kingdom of Cuzco (beginning around CE 1260) and a member of the Hurin dynasty
Manco Inca Yupanqui (1516–1544), one of the Incas of Vilcabamba
Pachacuti Inca Yupanqui, alias Pachakutiq, the ninth Sapa Inca (1438–1471/1472 CE)
Titu Cusi Yupanqui (1529–1571), son of Manco Inca Yupanqui, became Inca ruler of Vilcabamba
Túpac Inca Yupanqui the tenth Sapa Inca (1471–93 CE) of the Inca Empire, and fifth of the Hanan dynasty, younger son and successor of Pachacuti Inca Yupanqui

See also
Club Social y Deportivo Yupanqui, Argentine football (soccer) club
Tito Yupanqui, Bolivia, town in the La Paz Department, Bolivia
Tito Yupanqui Municipality, the third municipal section of the Manco Kapac Province in the La Paz Department, Bolivia